Abdul Razak (born October 10, 1964) is an Indonesian sprint canoer who competed in the early 1990s. At the 1992 Summer Olympics in Barcelona, he was eliminated in the repechages of both the K-2 500 m and the K-2 1000 m events.

External links
Sports-Reference.com profile

1964 births
Canoeists at the 1992 Summer Olympics
Indonesian male canoeists
Living people
Olympic canoeists of Indonesia
Asian Games medalists in canoeing
Canoeists at the 1990 Asian Games
Canoeists at the 1994 Asian Games
Medalists at the 1990 Asian Games
Asian Games bronze medalists for Indonesia
21st-century Indonesian people
20th-century Indonesian people